Hermínio Américo de Brito, nicknamed Britto (born May 6, 1914) is a Brazilian former footballer, who played as a midfielder. He was born in São Paulo. He played for Corinthians, América, Flamengo, Vasco da Gama, Internacional and Bangu at club level. For the Brazil national football team, he played two matches at the 1938 FIFA World Cup.

References

1914 births
Year of death missing
Footballers from São Paulo
Brazilian footballers
Brazilian football managers
Brazilian expatriate footballers
Brazil international footballers
Association football midfielders
Expatriate footballers in Argentina
Brazilian expatriate sportspeople in Argentina
1938 FIFA World Cup players
Sport Club Corinthians Paulista players
America Football Club (RJ) players
CR Flamengo footballers
Club Atlético Independiente footballers
Peñarol players
CR Vasco da Gama players
Sport Club Internacional players
Bangu Atlético Clube players
Sport Club Internacional managers